The Rugby Grange, near Fletcher, Henderson County, North Carolina, was built in 1860 in Italianate architecture.  The property includes agricultural outbuildings, agricultural fields and secondary structure, a total of 12 contributing buildings and one other contributing site.  They include Rugby Lodge II, the "Big House", the Cottage, the Shanty, Uncle Martin's and Uncle Billy's cabins, the ice house, and several barns.

It was listed on the National Register of Historic Places in 1987.

The house was the one-time home of a Swedish diplomat named George Westfeldt. He bought the property before the Civil War and named it in honor of Rugby School, an English public school.

References

Houses on the National Register of Historic Places in North Carolina
Italianate architecture in North Carolina
Houses completed in 1860
Houses in Henderson County, North Carolina
National Register of Historic Places in Henderson County, North Carolina